The Prijs der Nederlandse Letteren (Dutch Literature Prize) is awarded every three years to an author from the Netherlands, Belgium or, since 2005, Suriname writing in Dutch. It is considered the most prestigious literary award in the Dutch-speaking world, and the award is presented alternately by the reigning Dutch and Belgian monarchs.

The €40,000 prize is administered by the Taalunie. The jury comprises three Dutch members, three Flemish members and one from Suriname. The chair alternates between a Flemish and Dutch jury member. 

Until 2001 the prize was awarded alternately to a Flemish and a Dutch author. Subsequently, the four winners have all been Dutch; but the winner for 2012, Leonard Nolens, is Flemish.

List of winners

 1956: Herman Teirlinck
 1959: Adriaan Roland Holst
 1962: Stijn Streuvels
 1965: J.C. Bloem
 1968: Gerard Walschap
 1971: Simon Vestdijk
 1974: Marnix Gijsen
 1977: Willem Frederik Hermans
 1980: Maurice Gilliams
 1983: Lucebert
 1986: Hugo Claus
 1989: Gerrit Kouwenaar
 1992: Christine D'Haen
 1995: Harry Mulisch
 1998: Paul De Wispelaere
 2001: Gerard Reve (King Albert II of Belgium refused to present the prize to Reve because his partner was suspected of pedophilia)
 2004: Hella S. Haasse
 2007: Jeroen Brouwers (declined)
 2009: Cees Nooteboom
 2012: Leonard Nolens
 2015: Remco Campert
 2018: Judith Herzberg
 2021: Astrid Roemer

Notes

External links
 Homepage of the Taalunie

Dutch literary awards
Belgian literary awards
Awards established in 1956
1956 establishments in the Netherlands
1956 establishments in Belgium